Mario Bistoletti (born 1905, date of death unknown) was an Argentine water polo player. He competed in the men's tournament at the 1928 Summer Olympics.

References

1905 births
Year of death missing
Argentine male water polo players
Olympic water polo players of Argentina
Water polo players at the 1928 Summer Olympics
Place of birth missing